Benjamin Corey Cunningham (born July 7, 1990) is a former American football running back. He played college football at Middle Tennessee State and was signed by the St. Louis Rams as an undrafted free agent in 2013.

Early years
Cunningham attended Goodpasture Christian School in Madison, Tennessee, where he was a letterman in football, basketball, and track. In football, he rushed for 721 yards and 16 touchdowns on offense, while collecting 62 tackles and an interception on defense. As a senior, he rushed for a new school record 1,744 yards and 2,357 all purpose yards to go along with 29 touchdowns, leading Goodpasture to the state semifinals. He was named the Tennessee Titans Mr. Football Class 2A Back for 2008, the TSWA All-State and the Region Player of the Year and was voted to the All-Southern Football Team by the Orlando Sentinel. He owns the school record in single-season rushing yards (1,744), career touchdowns (60), touchdowns in a game (five), touchdowns in a season (29), and all-purpose yards in a season (2,357) and career (4,611). He was also selected to play at the Tennessee East-West All-Star Game.

Also an standout track & field athlete, Cunningham was one of the state's top performers in the sprinting events. At the 2009 TSSAA State T&F Championships, he took gold in both the 100 meters, with a time of 10.6 seconds, and in the 200 meters, at 21.86 seconds. In addition, he competed in the 800 meter run event and was a member of the 4 × 100 m relay squad. He also recorded a 4.39 40-yard dash in practice.

Regarded only as a two-star recruit by the Rivals.com recruiting network, Cunningham chose MTSU over scholarship offers from Miami (OH) and Tennessee Tech.

College career
Cunningham played for MTSU from 2009–2012. In 2009, he saw action in 11 games and was third on the team with 173 yards rushing on 46 attempts and two touchdowns. In 2010, he played in all 13 games and earned two starts and was fourth on the team with 355 rushing yards on 78 attempts to go with four touchdowns, and also had 16 receptions for 96 yards and returned 14 kickoffs for 364 yards (26.0). In 2011, he played in eight games and had six starts and was second on the team in rushing yards, with 501 yards and four touchdowns while leading all running backs with 17 receptions for 187 yards and a touchdown. In 2012, he was voted Second-team All-SBC and named Third-team All-SBC by CollegeSportsMadness.com, despite playing in just five games, he had his most productive season with 600 yards rushing and 11 touchdowns.

Professional career

St. Louis/Los Angeles Rams
Cunningham was signed by the St. Louis Rams as an undrafted free agent in 2013 and made their 53-man roster. For the 2013 season, he carried the ball 47 times for 261 yards (5.6 average) and a touchdown. He added six receptions for 59 yards in a backup role. In the 2014 season, he had 246 rushing yards and three rushing touchdowns to go along with 45 receptions for 352 receiving yards and a touchdown. In the 2015 season, he had 37 carries for 140 rushing yards and 26 receptions for 250 yards.

Cunningham signed a one-year extension with the Rams on April 6, 2016.

Cunningham was placed on injured reserve on December 15, 2016 with a neck injury. He finished the 2016 season with 21 carries for 101 rushing yards and 16 receptions for 91 yards.

Chicago Bears
On March 21, 2017, Cunningham signed with the Chicago Bears.

On September 10, 2017, in his Bears debut, Cunningham had one punt return for 23 yards in the 23–17 home loss to the Atlanta Falcons at Soldier Field. On October 9, against the Minnesota Vikings, he had a 38-yard touchdown reception from punter Pat O'Donnell on a trick play. Overall, he finished the 2017 season with 20 receptions for 240 yards and two touchdowns.

On April 3, 2018, Cunningham re-signed with the Bears on a one-year contract. During the 2018 season, Cunningham recorded 20 rushing yards on 11 attempts and one reception for nine yards. Overall, in the 2018 season, he had 11 carries for 20 rushing yards to go along with eight kickoff returns for 173 net yards.

Jacksonville Jaguars
On April 2, 2019, Cunningham signed with the Jacksonville Jaguars. He was released on August 11, 2019.

NFL career statistics

Personal life
After his playing career, Benny Cunningham alleged that the National Football League scripts its games and forces players to sign a non-disclosure agreement on the matter.

References

External links
Chicago Bears bio
Los Angeles Rams bio
Middle Tennessee Blue Raiders bio

1990 births
Living people
Players of American football from Nashville, Tennessee
American football return specialists
American football running backs
Middle Tennessee Blue Raiders football players
St. Louis Rams players
Los Angeles Rams players
Chicago Bears players
Jacksonville Jaguars players
Brian Piccolo Award winners